The National Institute for Consumer Research (SIFO) is a consumer affairs research institute based in Oslo, Norway. It has researchers in both social and natural sciences.

Albeit non-biased, it is not organizationally independent, as it is subordinate to the Norwegian Ministry of Children and Family Affairs, who appoints its board of directors and provides the funding.

The institute has 55 employees. It is divided into three departments; Consumption and Economy, Technology and Environment, and Market and Politics. The current director general is Arne Dulsrud; the director of research is Eivind Stø.

Directors
Tormod K. Lunde 1990-1997
Reidar Skaug
Anne Moxnes Jervell
Sigrun Vågeng 2013-2015
Arne Dulsrud 2015-

References

External links
 Official website

Research institutes in Norway
Education in Oslo
Government agencies of Norway
Multidisciplinary research institutes

Consumer organisations in Norway